Héctor Almonte (born October 17, 1975) is a former relief pitcher in Major League Baseball. From  through , Almonte played for the Florida Marlins (1999), Boston Red Sox (2003) and Montreal Expos (2003). He bats and throws right-handed.

Baseball career
Almonte played for two seasons with the Yomiuri Giants in Japan from –. In , he pitched in the Atlanta Braves organization and finished the season with Saraperos de Saltillo (Saltillo Sarape Makers) in the Triple-A Mexican League with a 2–0 record and a 1.54 ERA in ten games pitched. From –, Almonte played for the Atlantic League's Somerset Patriots in Bridgewater, New Jersey and also had a brief stint with the Chicago Cubs Triple-A affiliate. In , he played for the Atlantic League's Southern Maryland Blue Crabs. He signed to play with the Edmonton Capitals of the Golden Baseball League in 2009 and appeared in two games with them.

Personal life
His brother, Erick Almonte, is a former player for the New York Yankees and manager of the Peoria Chiefs.

References

External links
, or Retrosheet

1975 births
Acereros de Monclova players
Águilas Cibaeñas players
Águilas del Zulia players
Boston Red Sox players
Bravos de Margarita players
Brevard County Manatees players
Calgary Cannons players
Dominican Republic expatriate baseball players in Canada
Dominican Republic expatriate baseball players in Japan
Dominican Republic expatriate baseball players in the United States
Edmonton Capitals players
Florida Marlins players
Iowa Cubs players
Kane County Cougars players

Living people
Major League Baseball pitchers
Major League Baseball players from the Dominican Republic
Montreal Expos players
Nashville Sounds players
Pastora de los Llanos players
Pawtucket Red Sox players
Sportspeople from Santo Domingo
Portland Sea Dogs players
Richmond Braves players
Somerset Patriots players
Southern Maryland Blue Crabs players
Yomiuri Giants players
Dominican Republic expatriate baseball players in Venezuela
Dominican Republic expatriate baseball players in Mexico
Dominican Republic expatriate baseball players in Puerto Rico
Colorado Springs Sky Sox players
Dominican Republic expatriate baseball players in Taiwan
Dominican Summer League Marlins players
Gulf Coast Marlins players
Gigantes de Carolina players
Saraperos de Saltillo players
Dmedia T-REX players